Jefferson Park Historic District can refer to:
(sorted by state, then city/town)

 Jefferson Park Historic District (Tucson, Arizona), listed on the National Register of Historic Places (NRHP) in Pima County
 Jefferson Park Historic District (Oklahoma City, Oklahoma), listed on the NRHP in Oklahoma County